Ivarsson is a patronymic surname meaning "son of Ivar". Notable people with the surname include:

Jan Ivarsson (born 1931), Swedish translator
Johan Ivarsson, Swedish orienteer
Johan Ivarsson (ice hockey) (born 1995), Swedish ice hockey player
Karl Marenius Ivarsson (1867–1922), Norwegian educator and politician
Lars Ivarsson (born 1963), Swedish ice hockey player
Maja Ivarsson (born 1979), Swedish singer

See also
16135 Ivarsson, a main-belt asteroid

Patronymic surnames